B.A. Paris (pen name) is a Franco-British writer of fiction, mainly in the psychological thriller subgenre. Her debut novel, Behind Closed Doors (2016), was a New York Times and Sunday Times bestseller. It has been translated into 40 languages and has sold more than 3.5 million copies worldwide.

Her other books include The Breakdown (2017), Bring Me Back (2018), The Dilemma (2019) and The Therapist (2021). 

She is published by HarperCollins Publishers in the UK and St Martin's Press in the US.

Background
B.A. Paris was born in Surrey, England, in 1958 to a French mother and Irish father. She is the third of 6 children, including 4 brothers and a sister. After completing her education, she moved to France, where she worked as a trader in an international bank in Paris for several years. During this time, she met her husband, with whom she now has 5 daughters. They eventually left the world of finance to set up a language school together. 

It was only after turning 50 that B.A. Paris began writing, when one of her daughters suggested she enter a writing competition advertised in a magazine. While she didn't win, this led her to write her first novels, including her internationally bestselling debut Behind Closed Doors.

Today, B.A. Paris lives in Hampshire with her husband and continues to write psychological thrillers.

Novels

Success of Behind Closed Doors 
B.A. Paris's debut novel Behind Closed Doors was picked up in 2014 by her agent, Camilla Bolton, at the Darley Anderson Literary Agency in London. Upon being published the following year by HarperCollins Publishers, the book quickly became a #1 New York Times and Sunday Times bestseller. She was nominated in the Best Debut Author and Best Mystery & Thriller categories of the Goodreads Choice Awards of 2016.

In 2017, Behind Closed Doors won the Gold Nielsen Bestseller Award for UK sales of 500,000 copies, making B.A. Paris the only debut fiction author to win a gold award that year. The book went on to win the Platinum Nielsen Bestseller Award in 2019 for sales of 1,000,000 copies in the UK alone. To date, more than 3.5 million copies of Behind Closed Doors have sold globally since its release.

The film and TV rights for the story were acquired by Stone Village Productions in 2016. As of 2022, the film adaptation of Behind Closed Doors is in post-production. The film is titled Blackwater Lane and is directed by Jeff Celentano.

List of published works 
 Behind Closed Doors (2016)
 The Breakdown (2017)
 Bring Me Back (2018)
 The Understudy (2019, with Clare Mackintosh, Holly Brown, and Sophie Hannah)
 The Dilemma (2020)
 The Therapist (2021)
 The Prisoner (2022)

Critical Reception 
Writing for The Toronto Star, Jack Batten said Paris "is a consistent whiz at stitching any number of random events and devious characters into a winner of a plot."

The Guardian critic Alison Flood said The Prisoner had an "excellent premise," but "didn’t quite live up to [its] promise."

References 

Living people
21st-century British novelists
Year of birth missing (living people)
Place of birth missing (living people)
British women novelists
21st-century British women writers